Acallis xantippe is a species of snout moth in the genus Acallis. It was described by Harrison Gray Dyar Jr. in 1914, and is known from Panama.

References

Moths described in 1914
Chrysauginae
Moths of Central America
Taxa named by Harrison Gray Dyar Jr.